A query-level feature or QLF is a ranking feature utilized in a machine-learned ranking algorithm.

Example QLFs:
 How many times has this query been run in the last month?
 How many words are in the query?
 What is the sum/average/min/max/median of the BM25F values for the query?

Machine learning algorithms